Lilyvale is a hamlet in the English county of Kent.

It is located north of the A20 road, south east of the town of Ashford, near the village of Smeeth.

External links 

Hamlets in Kent